Masato Suzuki is a Japanese mixed martial artist.

Mixed martial arts record

|-
| Loss
| align=center| 4-5-2
| Rumina Sato
| Technical Submission (armbar)
| Shooto - Vale Tudo Junction 1
| 
| align=center| 1
| align=center| 3:00
| Tokyo, Japan
| 
|-
| Win
| align=center| 4-4-2
| Yuji Hashiguchi
| Submission (kimura)
| Shooto - Vale Tudo Access 4
| 
| align=center| 2
| align=center| 2:59
| Japan
| 
|-
| Win
| align=center| 3-4-2
| Masahiro Oishi
| Submission (armbar)
| Shooto - Vale Tudo Access 1
| 
| align=center| 2
| align=center| 0:43
| Tokyo, Japan
| 
|-
| Draw
| align=center| 2-4-2
| Kyuhei Ueno
| Draw
| Shooto - Shooto
| 
| align=center| 4
| align=center| 3:00
| Tokyo, Japan
| 
|-
| Loss
| align=center| 2-4-1
| Noboru Asahi
| Submission (armbar)
| Shooto - Shooto
| 
| align=center| 5
| align=center| 1:39
| Tokyo, Japan
| 
|-
| Loss
| align=center| 2-3-1
| Takenori Ito
| Decision (unanimous)
| Shooto - Shooto
| 
| align=center| 3
| align=center| 3:00
| Tokyo, Japan
| 
|-
| Draw
| align=center| 2-2-1
| Masaya Onodera
| Draw
| Shooto - Shooto
| 
| align=center| 3
| align=center| 3:00
| Tokyo, Japan
| 
|-
| Loss
| align=center| 2-2
| Takashi Ishizaki
| Decision (unanimous)
| Shooto - Shooto
| 
| align=center| 4
| align=center| 3:00
| Tokyo, Japan
| 
|-
| Win
| align=center| 2-1
| Takenori Ito
| Decision (unanimous)
| Shooto - Shooto
| 
| align=center| 3
| align=center| 3:00
| Tokyo, Japan
| 
|-
| Loss
| align=center| 1-1
| Noboru Asahi
| Submission (kneebar)
| Shooto - Shooto
| 
| align=center| 1
| align=center| 0:00
| Osaka, Japan
| 
|-
| Win
| align=center| 1-0
| Kenji Ogusu
| Decision (unanimous)
| Shooto - Shooto
| 
| align=center| 3
| align=center| 3:00
| Tokyo, Japan
|

See also
List of male mixed martial artists

References

External links
 
 Masato Suzuki at mixedmartialarts.com

Japanese male mixed martial artists
Living people
Year of birth missing (living people)